ESSA-5 (or TOS-C) was a spin-stabilized operational meteorological satellite. Its name was derived from that of its oversight agency, the Environmental Science Services Administration (ESSA).

Launch 
ESSA-5 was launched on April 20, 1967, at 11:17 UTC. It was launched atop a Delta rocket from Vandenberg Air Force Base, California, U.S.. ESSA-5 had an inclination of 101.9°, and an orbited the earth once every 113.6 minutes.

References

Spacecraft launched in 1967
Weather satellites of the United States